Easter is a surname. Notable people with the surname include:

David Easter (born 1959), English actor
Graham Easter (born 1969), English footballer
Jack Easter (1907–1979), Australian politician
Jamal Easter (born 1987), Welsh Association Football player
Jeff & Sheri Easter, Southern Gospel duo
Jermaine Easter (born 1982), Welsh Association Football player
Luke Easter (baseball) (1915–1979), professional baseball player in Major League Baseball and the Negro leagues
Luke Easter (musician), singer and songwriter with the Christian metal band Tourniquet
Mark Easter (born 1982), rugby union player born in Swaziland
Melanie Easter (born 1972), British paralympic swimmer and cyclist
Mitch Easter (born 1954), American musician and producer
Nick Easter (born 1978), English rugby union player
Paul Easter (born 1963), Scottish freestyle swimmer
Wayne Easter (born 1949), Canadian politician
Harrison Easter (born 2005), South African entrepreneur
Wyatt Easter (born 2002), Demon